Wythop is a civil parish in the north of Cumbria, England, between Cockermouth and Keswick. Population details are no longer maintained and can be found included in the parish of Embleton

Wythop is within one mile of the hamlets of Dubwath (in the parish of Setmurthy) and Wythop Mill (in Embleton).

Administratively Wythop forms part of the district of Allerdale.

Etymology and structure
'Wythop' is " 'withy valley', cf. 'wīðig', 'hop' " (from the Old English). 'Wīðig','withy' means 'willow', 'hop' means 'a small enclosed valley'; so 'Wythop' is the 'valley of willow trees'.
Alfred Wainwright stressed the unique nature of Wythop valley, in that instead of rising to a crest it fell away to the declinity of Bassenthwaite Lake.  However he also made the point that "its scenery is in no way freakish. ''Here is a charming and secluded natural sanctuary in an idyllic setting".

Viewpoint
The promontory of Beck Wythop was selected by Thomas West as one of his four 'stations' for viewing Bassenthwaite Lake.

See also

Listed buildings in Wythop

References

External links

  Cumbria County History Trust: Wythop (nb: provisional research only - see Talk page)

Villages in Cumbria
Allerdale
Civil parishes in Cumbria